Jozef Wagenhoffer (born May 11, 1986 in Bratislava)  is a Slovak professional ice hockey player who played with HC Slovan Bratislava in the Slovak Extraliga.

References

Living people
HC Slovan Bratislava players
Flint Generals players
1986 births
Slovak ice hockey defencemen
Ice hockey people from Bratislava
Slovak expatriate ice hockey players in the United States
Slovak expatriate ice hockey players in the Czech Republic
Slovak expatriate sportspeople in France
Expatriate ice hockey players in France
Bisons de Neuilly-sur-Marne players
BK Mladá Boleslav players
HK Trnava players
HC Berounští Medvědi players